The Possessed is a 2021 Australian horror film written and directed by Chris Sun and starring John Jarratt, Lincoln Lewis and Angie Kent. The film premiered at the 2021 London FrightFest Film Festival and was scheduled to be released in Australia in November 2021.

Plot
The film follows exorcists Jacob Chandler and his nephew Liam (Lincoln Lewis), who notice that demonic possessions appear to be on the rise.

Cast
John Jarratt as Jacob Chandler
Lincoln Lewis as Liam Chandler
Angie Kent as Nadine
Lauren Grimson as Atalie Carlisle
Jade Kevin Foster as Orion
Romy Poulier
Sean Lynch as Martin
Simone Buchanan as Carissa
Melissa Bell as Helen
Melissa Tkautz as Shania

Production
The Possessed was filmed in Queensland.

References

External links
 

2021 films
2021 horror films
Australian horror films
2020s English-language films
2020s Australian films